Francin is a former commune in the Savoie department in the Auvergne-Rhône-Alpes region in south-eastern France. On 1 January 2019, it was merged into the new commune Porte-de-Savoie.

The Château de Carron is found here.

See also
Communes of the Savoie department

References

External links

Official site

Former communes of Savoie